The  DS 5LS is a premium compact executive car and the first traditional sedan to have been designed and developed by the DS division of the French automaker PSA Peugeot Citroën; it was launched on March 28, 2014. It is the first DS model that applied "DS wing" front face design and wears independent DS logo and this model is considered as a declaration of the independence of DS brand. Currently, it is produced and sold only in China. Its hatchback version is the DS 4S.

Gallery

References

External links

Official website

DS vehicles
Compact executive cars
Luxury vehicles
Sedans
Flagship vehicles
Cars of China
Cars introduced in 2014